Dorsa Lister is a wrinkle ridge system at  on the Moon, in southern Mare Serenitatis. It is 180 km in diameter and was named after English naturalist and physician Martin Lister in 1976.

References

External links

LAC-42
Dorsa Lister at The Moon Wiki

Lister
Mare Serenitatis